Bybee is a surname. Notable people with the surname include:

 Ariel Bybee (born 1943), American mezzo-soprano with a distinguished career as a soloist, voice teacher and university opera director
 Jay Bybee (born 1953), federal judge on the United States Court of Appeals
 Joan Bybee (born 1945), American linguist
 Jackson Bybee (born 2007), musician and poet.